A bike rental or bike hire business rents out bicycles for short periods of time, usually for a few hours. Most rentals are provided by bike shops as a sideline to their main businesses of sales and service, but  shops specialize in rentals.  
  
As with car rental, bicycle rental shops primarily serve people who do not have access to a vehicle, typically travellers and particularly embers and others charge a monthly or yearly fee. Most such systems allow a member to sign out a bike from any station for up to half an hour of free use, enough for most commuters to travel to their destination where they can drop  the bike at any station bike sharing  start  after the first free half hour in order to encourage the user to return the bicycle at the end of each trip, and take another bicycle for the next trip.

Cycling
Vehicle rental